WMAF (1230 AM) is a silent radio station licensed to Madison, Florida, United States. The station is owned by Fred Dockins, through licensee Dockins Communications, Inc., and features programming from ABC Radio.

References

External links

MAF